This is a list of archives in Spain. There are more than 30,000 archives in Spain.

Archives in Spain

Andalusia 
 Archivo General de Indias
 Archivo Histórico Provincial de Almería
 Archivo Histórico Provincial de Cádiz
 Archivo Histórico Provincial de Córdoba
 Archivo Histórico Provincial de Granada
 
 Archivo Histórico Provincial de Huelva
 Archivo Histórico Provincial de Jaén
 Archivo Histórico Provincial de Málaga
 Archivo Histórico Provincial de Sevilla

Aragon 
Archivo de la Administración de la Comunidad Autónoma de Aragón 
Archivo Histórico Provincial de Huesca 
Archivo Histórico Provincial de Teruel 
Archivo Histórico Provincial de Zaragoza
Archivo de la Diputación Provincial de Huesca
Archivo de la Diputación Provincial de Zaragoza
Archivo Municipal de Zaragoza 
Archivo Universitario de la Universidad de Zaragoza
Archivo de la Fundación Bernardo Aladrén (es)
Archivo de la Casa de Ganaderos de Zaragoza (es) 
Archivo de la Catedral de Huesca

Principality of Asturias 
 Archivo Histórico Provincial de Asturias
 Website http://www.archivosdeasturias.info

Balearic Islands 
 Archivo del Reino de Mallorca

Basque Country 
 Archivo Histórico Provincial de Álava 
 Archivo Histórico Provincial de Guipúzcoa 
 Archivo Histórico Provincial de Vizcaya

Canary Islands 

 Archivo Histórico Provincial de Las Palmas "Joaquín Blanco"
 Archivo Histórico Provincial de Santa Cruz de Tenerife
 Archivo General de La Palma

Cantabria

Castile-La Mancha 
 Archivo Histórico Provincial de Cuenca
 
 Municipal Archive of Toledo

Castile and León 
 
 Archivo Histórico Provincial de Segovia
 
 Website http://www.archivoscastillayleon.jcyl.es

Catalonia 
 Arxiu Nacional de Catalunya
 Arxiu Municipal de Barcelona

Extremadura 
 Archivo Histórico Provincial de Badajoz
 Archivo Histórico Provincial de Cáceres
 Website http://www.archivosextremadura.com

Galicia

La Rioja

Madrid 
 Archivo Histórico Nacional

Region of Murcia

Foral Community of Navarre

Valencian Community 
 Archivo Histórico Provincial de Alicante

Other 
 Arxiu General de la Corona d'Aragó
 Archivo General de Simancas
 Archivo General de la Administración
 Centro Documental de la Memoria Histórica
 Sección Nobleza del Archivo Histórico Nacional
 Archivo Central del Ministerio de Cultura

See also 
 Portal de Archivos Españoles (federated search)
 List of libraries in Spain
 List of museums in Spain
 Open access in Spain

References

Bibliography

External links 

 Archives section in Minister of Culture of Spain 
 Spanish archives portal 

 
Spain
Archives
archives